James Milne (6 June 1886 – 20 July 1958) was a British sports shooter. He competed in three events at the 1908 Summer Olympics.

References

1886 births
1958 deaths
British male sport shooters
Olympic shooters of Great Britain
Shooters at the 1908 Summer Olympics
Place of birth missing